The 2013 Dublin Senior Football Championship was the top club championship competition on the Dublin GAA calendar for 2013. The championship was changed since 2012, with a backdoor system no longer in place, meaning that the championship was played on a knockout basis. All teams knocked out in the first round of the Dublin championship were entered into a new Dublin Senior B Championship.

Round one
The first round tie between Raheny and Naomh Maur finished on a draw after extra time and therefore the 16th team in the second round was to be decided with a replay. The shock of the round was a victory for Dublin minnows Ballinteer St. John's against a strong Oliver Plunketts Eoghan Ruadh side. Raheny defeated Naomh Maur in the first round replay at Parnell Park.

Round two
The following teams qualified for the last 16 of the Dublin Senior Football Championship: St. Jude's, Parnell's, Ballyboden St. Enda's, Fingal Ravens, Templeogue Synge Street, Thomas Davis, UCD, St. Vincent's, Ballinteer St. John's, St. Sylvester's, Na Fianna, Kilmacud Crokes, Ballymun Kickhams, St. Brigid's, Raheny and Erin's Isle.* All winning teams from the second round progressed to the quarter finals of the Dublin championship and the losing sides will return in the 2014 Dublin Senior Football Championship.

Winning teams in bold.

Quarter-finals
St. Vincent's, St. Jude's, St. Brigid's, Raheny, St. Sylvester's, Ballyboden St. Enda's and Ballymun Kickhams all qualified for the quarter finals of the Dublin championship.

Semifinals

Finals

Senior B Championship

First round
The eight winning teams in the first round progress to the second round of the senior B championship. The eight losers must enter a relegation championship.

Quarter-finals

Relegation Championship
The relegation championship is the opposite of the usual format of a championship. The winner of each game leaves the competition when they lose their game, the losers go on to the next stage. The team that loses all their games will get relegated if the Dublin Intermediate champions are a non senior championship club. The relegation championship was cancelled as St. Mark's opted to be relegated and rebuild their team in the Dublin Intermediate Football Championship in 2015.

References

External links
Dublin GAA Fixtures & Results
Live Updates and Scores
Quarter Final Draws

Dublin Senior Football Championship
Dublin Senior Football Championship